Aproctidae is a family of nematodes belonging to superfamily Filarioidea in order Rhabditida.

Genera:
 Aprocta Linstow, 1883
 Hovorkonema Jurasek, 1977
 Lissonema Linstow, 1903
 Mawsonfilaria Anderson & Chabaud, 1958
 Pseudaprocta Schikhobalova, 1930
 Squamofilaria Schmerling, 1925
 Tetracheilonema Diesing, 1861

References

Nematodes